Arjalabai is a village and Gram panchayat of Nalgonda mandal, Nalgonda district, in Telangana state, in India.

References

Villages in Nalgonda district